Ongassaare (formerly Kõnnu) is a village in Alutaguse Parish, Ida-Viru County in northeastern Estonia.

Ongassaare is the birthplace of the organist and composer Alfred Karindi.

References

 

Villages in Ida-Viru County